Matias Pulli (born March 8, 1995) is a Finnish ice hockey defenceman.

Pulli made his Liiga debut playing with HC TPS during the 2013–14 Liiga season.

References

External links

1995 births
Living people
Finnish ice hockey defencemen
HC TPS players
People from Raisio
Sportspeople from Southwest Finland